Firo & Klawd is an isometric video game published by BMG. It was released for PlayStation, MS-DOS, and Microsoft Windows in 1996.

Gameplay
The player takes the role of either Firo (an ape police detective) or Klawd (an odd job cat) and sets out to find out who is distributing phony dollar bills around the city. Each level consists of branching paths to take in the story, some levels switch to a first person point of view where you shoot villains on screen however losing on these levels will cost you a life, all ending up at the same place eventually.

Reception
Spanish magazine Hobby Consolas gave the game a score of 86. French magazine Player One gave the game 88% German magazine Video Games gave it 68%.

References

External links

1996 video games
Platform games
PlayStation (console) games
Video games about cats
Video games about primates
Video games about police officers
Video games developed in the United Kingdom
Video games with isometric graphics
Windows games
Fictional duos
BMG Interactive games
Multiplayer and single-player video games
Blitz Games Studios games